Year 356 (CCCLVI) was a leap year starting on Monday (link will display the full calendar) of the Julian calendar. At the time, it was known as the Year of the Consulship of Constantius and Iulianus (or, less frequently, year 1109 Ab urbe condita). The denomination 356 for this year has been used since the early medieval period, when the Anno Domini calendar era became the prevalent method in Europe for naming years.

Events 
 By place 
 Roman Empire 
 February 19 – Emperor Constantius II issues a decree closing all pagan temples in the Roman Empire, and ordering the banishment once again of the anti-Arian patriarch of Alexandria, Athanasius. He tries to have him arrested during a vigil service, but Athanasius flees to the Nitrian desert in Upper Egypt.
 The veneration of non-Christian images is banned in the Roman Empire.
 Siege of Autun: Julian receives a report that Augustodunum (Autun) is under attack by the Alemanni. The city walls are in poor state and in danger of falling.  
 Battle of Reims: Julian is defeated by the Alemanni at Reims (Gaul). 
 Battle of Brumath: Roman forces pursue Germanic warbands through the Gallic countryside. Julian wins an open battle near Brumath (Alsace).
 Rhaetia (Switzerland) is invaded by the Alemanni. 
 Winter – Siege of Senonae: Julian over-winters at Senonae (Bourgogne). German federated troops (foederati) desert and hostile warbands besiege the town.

 Asia 
 Naemul becomes king of the Silla dynasty (Three Kingdoms of Korea).

 By topic 
 Religion 

 Anthony the Great (pictured) dies at his hermitage near the Red Sea in mid-January at age 105 (approximate), having preached against Arianism, and having tried to codify guidelines for monastic life. His followers subsequently establish the Monastery of Saint Anthony, beginning the tradition of Coptic monasticism.
 Construction begins on the first basilica of Saint Peter in Rome.

Births 
 31 March – Aelia Flaccilla, Roman empress and wife of Theodosius I (d. 386)
 John II, Byzantine bishop, theologian and writer (d. 417)

Deaths 
 Amasius of Teano, bishop Teano (also known as St. Paris)
 Anthony the Great, Egyptian monk and Desert Father
 Cai Mo (or Daoming), Chinese official and politician (b. 281)
 Qiang (or Mingde), Chinese empress and wife of Fú Jiàn  
 Rav Nachman bar Yitzchak, Babylonian scholar and rabbi 
 Sanctinus of Meaux, French bishop and missionary (b. 270)
 Vetranio, Roman statesman, usurper and co-emperor
 Yin Hao (or Yuanyuan), Chinese general and politician

References